The Hispano-Suiza 12X was an aircraft piston engine designed in France by Hispano-Suiza during the early 1930s. A 12-cylinder Vee, liquid-cooled design, the 12X was used on several aircraft types, some of them being used in limited numbers during World War II. Due to the 12X's limited power output, its derivative the more powerful Hispano-Suiza 12Y had a longer career.

Variants 
Tabulated data from: Lage, 2004

Hispano-Suiza 12Xrs

Applications 
 Bernard 260
 Blériot-SPAD S.510
 Dewoitine D.500
 Hanriot H.110
 Hawker Spanish Fury
 Hawker Spanish Osprey
 Loire 102
 Loire 130
 Loire-Nieuport LN.40
 Lioré et Olivier H-246
 Mitsubishi A5M3a
 Morane-Saulnier M.S. 227
 Nakajima Ki-12
 Potez 540
 Potez 650

Specifications (12Xcrs)

See also

References

 Danel, Raymond and Cuny, Jean. L'aviation française de bombardement et de renseignement 1918-1940 Docavia n°12, Editions Larivière

Hispano-Suiza aircraft engines
1930s aircraft piston engines